Philippe Vigand (6 May 1957 – 15 November 2020) was a French writer. He had locked-in syndrome.

Publications
Only the Eyes Say Yes: A Love Story (Putain de silence) (1997, English edition, 2000)
Promenades immobiles (2000)
Meaulne, mon village (2004)
Légume vert (2011)

References

1958 births
2020 deaths
French writers